The term red tail may refer to the following animals:

Red-tailed hawk (Buteo jamaicensis), a North American bird of prey
Red-tailed boa (Boa constrictor), a Central American snake
Redtail catfish (Phractocephalus hemioliopterus), a South American freshwater fish
Red-tailed black shark or Red-tailed shark (Epalzeorhynchos bicolor), a common aquarium freshwater fish native to Thailand
Red-tailed black cockatoo (Calyptorhynchus banksii), a cockatoo native to Australia
Red-tailed tropicbird (Phaëthon rubricauda), a seabird 
Red-tailed sportive lemur (Lepilemur ruficaudatus), a primate native to Madagascar
Redtail (Ceriagrion aeruginosum) a species of damselfly found in south-eastern Australia

The term may also refer to:
Redtailing, following a fellow snowboarder too closely.
Redtail, a CRM designed exclusively for financial professionals
Redtail Nature Awareness, a nature based camp in Pictou County, Nova Scotia, Canada
 A member of the Tuskegee Airmen (the popular name for the 332d Fighter Group), a unit of African American fighter pilots during World War II
Red Tails, a 2012 movie
Red Tail Project
Redtail, a cat from Erin Hunter's Warriors series
Redtail Telematics Corporation, a manufacturer and distributor of GPS tracking equipment.
A nickname for Northwest Airlines

Animal common name disambiguation pages